National Highway 102A, commonly referred to as NH 102A is a national highway in  India. It is a spur road of National Highway 2. NH-102A traverses the state of Manipur in India.

Route description 
Tadubi, Paomata, Ukhrul, Finch corner, Kasom Khullen, Kampang, Tengnoupal.

Major intersections 
 
  Terminal near Tadubi.
  near Ukhrul.
  Terminal near Tengnoupal.

See also 

 List of National Highways in India
 List of National Highways in India by state

References

External links 

 NH 102A on OpenStreetMap

National highways in India
National Highways in Manipur